Damodran Nair is a former Fijian politician of Indian descent, who held the Tavua Open Constituency in the House of Representatives for the Fiji Labour Party (FLP) in a by-election on 17 January 2004 following the death of the incumbent, Pravin Singh, in an automobile accident in late 2003.  Nair was re-elected in the May 2006 parliamentary election. His parliamentary career was ended by the military coup of 5 December 2006.

In January 2009, Nair appealed for help for people from the district of Tavua affected by severe flooding.

References

Fijian Hindus
Fiji Labour Party politicians
Indian members of the House of Representatives (Fiji)
Living people
Year of birth missing (living people)
Politicians from Tavua, Fiji
Fijian politicians of Indian descent